Edward Charles Payton Jr. (born August 3, 1951) is a former American football running back and kick returner who played five seasons in the NFL from 1977 to 1982 for the Cleveland Browns, Detroit Lions, Kansas City Chiefs and Minnesota Vikings. He also played in the Canadian Football League. He is the older brother of the late Chicago Bears player Walter Payton, the uncle of Brittney Payton and the uncle of the current WGN-TV sports anchor Jarrett Payton.

Payton played college football at Jackson State University and signed undrafted by the Browns. Payton was primarily used as a kick and punt returner. He led the NFL with 53 kickoffs for 1184 yards in 1980. Payton ran back two kickoffs and one punt return for touchdowns in his career, two in the same game. On December 17, 1977, Payton ran a kick return and a punt return for a touchdown for the Lions in a game against the Vikings.

Eddie Payton is the former head golf coach at Jackson State, coaching both the men's and women's teams. From 1986 – 2016, Payton led the Jackson State Golf program to 37 Southwestern Athletic Conference championships. His men’s team won 23 conference titles, 8 National Minority championships, and was the first HBCU to make the NCAA Men’s National Golf Championships in 1995. He helped start the women’s golf program in 1994. From there, he led the women’s team to 14 SWAC titles and also the first HBCU NCAA appearance for women in 1999.

Notes

External links 
Eddie Payton stats at pro-football reference
Eddie Payton stats at Database football

1951 births
Living people
American football running backs
American football return specialists
Cleveland Browns players
Detroit Lions players
Kansas City Chiefs players
Minnesota Vikings players
Jackson State Tigers football players
People from Columbia, Mississippi